A baked potato, known in some parts of the United Kingdom (though not generally Scotland) as a jacket potato, is a preparation of potato. It may be served with fillings, toppings or condiments such as butter, cheese, sour cream, gravy, baked beans, and even ground meat or corned beef.

Some varieties of potato, such as Russet and King Edward, are more suitable for baking than others, owing to their size and consistency. Despite the popular misconception that potatoes are fattening, baked potatoes can be part of a healthy diet.

Preparation
Potatoes can be baked in a conventional gas or electric oven, a convection oven, a microwave oven, on a barbecue grill, or on (or in) an open fire. Some restaurants use special ovens designed specifically to cook large numbers of potatoes, then keep them warm and ready for service.

Prior to cooking, the potato should be scrubbed clean, washed and dried with eyes and surface blemishes removed, and basted with oil (usually olive oil) or butter and/or salt. Pricking the potato with a fork or knife allows steam to escape during the cooking process. Potatoes cooked in a microwave oven  without pricking the skin might split open due to built up internal pressure from unvented steam. Microwaving takes from six to twelve minutes depending on oven power and potato size, but does not generally produce a crisp skin. Some recipes call for use of both a microwave and a conventional oven, with the microwave being used to vent most of the steam prior to the cooking process.

Wrapping the potato in aluminium foil before cooking in a standard oven will help to retain moisture, while leaving it unwrapped will result in a crisp skin. Cooking over an open fire or in the coals of a barbecue may require wrapping in foil to prevent burning of the skin. A potato buried directly in coals of a fire cooks very nicely, with a mostly burned and inedible skin. A baked potato is fully cooked when its internal temperature reaches .

Once a potato has been baked, some people discard the skin and eat only the softer and moister interior, while others enjoy the taste and texture of the crisp skin, which is rich in dietary fiber. Potatoes baked in their skins may lose between 20 and 40% of their vitamin C content because heating in air is slow and vitamin inactivation can continue for a long time. Small potatoes bake more quickly than large ones and therefore retain more of their vitamin C.

Variations
Some people bake their potatoes and then scoop out the interior, leaving the skin as a shell. The white interior flesh can then be mixed with various other food items such as cheese, butter,  or bacon bits. This mixture is then spooned back into the skin shells and they are replaced in the oven to warm through. In America, these are known variously as loaded potato skins, filled potatoes and twice-baked potatoes.  In Great Britain, toppings or fillings tend to be more varied than they are in America: baked beans,  curried chicken, coronation chicken, chilli con carne, tuna, and prawn fillings are popular, and in Scotland even haggis is used as a filling for jacket potatoes.

A variation is Hasselback potatoes, where the potato is cut into very thin slices almost down the bottom, so that the potato still holds together, and is then baked in the oven, occasionally scalloped with cheese.  The proper noun "Hasselback" refers to the luxurious Hasselbacken hotel and restaurant in Stockholm which originated this dish.

Regional variations

North America
Many restaurants serve baked potatoes with sides such as butter, sour cream,  chives, shredded cheese, and bacon bits. Baked potatoes that are served with multiple of these sides are commonly referred to as loaded potatoes or loaded baked potatoes. These potatoes can be a side item to a steak dinner, or some similar entree.  Sides are usually optional and customers can order as many or as few as they wish.

Large, stuffed baked potatoes may be served as an entree, usually filled with meat in addition to any of the ingredients mentioned above. Barbecued or smoked meat or chili is substituted. Vegetables such as broccoli may also be added.

Idaho
Idaho is the major producing state of potatoes. The Idaho baked potato was heavily promoted by the Northern Pacific Railroad in the early 20th century, often using Hollywood movie stars.

Hazen Titus was appointed as the Northern Pacific Railway's dining car superintendent in 1908. He talked to Yakima Valley farmers who complained that they were unable to sell their potato crops because their potatoes were simply too large.  They fed them to hogs.  Titus learned that a single potato could weigh from two to five pounds, but that smaller potatoes were preferred by the end buyers of the vegetable and that many considered them not to be edible because their thick, rough skin made them difficult to cook.

Titus and his staff discovered the "inedible" potatoes were delicious after baking in a slow oven.  He contracted to purchase as many potatoes as the farmers could produce that were more than two pounds in weight.  Soon after the first delivery of "Netted Gem Bakers", they were offered to diners on the North Coast Limited beginning in 1909. Word of the line's specialty offering traveled quickly, and before long it was using "the Great Big Baked Potato" as a slogan to promote the railroad's passenger service.  When an addition was built for the Northern Pacific's Seattle commissary in 1914, reporter wrote, "A large trade mark, in the shape of a baked potato, 40 ft.long and 18 ft. in diameter, surmounts the roof. The potato is electric lighted and its eyes, through the electric mechanism, are made to wink constantly.  A cube of butter thrust into its split top glows intermittently."  Premiums such as postcards, letter openers, and spoons were also produced to promote "The Route of the Great Big Baked Potato"; the slogan served the Northern Pacific for about 50 years. The song "Great Big Baked Potato" (words by N.R. Streeter and H. Caldwell; Music by Oliver George) was written about this potato.

United Kingdom

A baked potato is sometimes called a jacket potato in the United Kingdom. The baked potato has been popular in the UK for many years. In the mid-19th century, jacket potatoes were sold on the streets by hawkers during the autumn and winter months. In London, it was estimated that some 10 tons of baked potatoes were sold each day by this method. Common jacket potato fillings (or "toppings") in the United Kingdom include grated cheddar cheese, baked beans, tuna mayonnaise, chili con carne and chicken and bacon.

Baked potatoes are often eaten on Guy Fawkes Night; traditionally they were often baked in the glowing embers of a bonfire.

France
A baked potato is called "pomme de terre au four" in French. It may be served as an accompaniment to a meat dish, or, in a fast-food restaurant called a "pataterie", be the centre of a meal.

Armenia
A regional variation of the baked potato is known in rural Armenian villages surrounding Lake Sevan as "p'ur". Dried cow dung is stacked and used as fuel to slowly bake unseasoned potatoes which are placed in the center.

Turkey

Kumpir, a baked potato with various fillings, is a popular fast food in Turkey.  In its basic form, it is made with potatoes that are wrapped with foil and baked in special ovens. The potatoes are sliced down the middle and the insides are mixed with unsalted butter and puréed with kaşar cheese. However, all sorts of foods can be added to the potato: mayonnaise, ketchup, pickles, sweetcorn, sausage slices, carrots, mushrooms and Russian salad. The cafés in Ortaköy, Istanbul, make kumpir that are especially popular with the tourists and offer even more ingredients.

Russia
Although baked potato with various fillings is not considered a traditional Russian dish, it has recently been gaining popularity as a fast food.

Brazil
The baked potato is reasonably popular in Brazil, where it is sometimes known as batata Inglesa (lit. translated as 'English potato', likely due to the use of an English variety of potato: the 'King Edward').

References

British cuisine
French cuisine
Brazilian cuisine
Turkish cuisine
Armenian cuisine
Russian cuisine
Potato dishes
Baked foods
Street food in Turkey
American vegetable dishes